Marcel Felder and Carlos Salamanca were the defending champions but Felder decided not to participate.
Salamanca played alongside Eduardo Struvay.
Martín Alund and Guido Pella won the title by defeating Sebastián Decoud and Rubén Ramírez Hidalgo 6–3, 2–6, [10–5] in the final.

Seeds

Draw

Draw

References
 Main Draw

Seguros Bolivar Open Pereira - Doubles
2012 Doubles